Vladimir Semyonov may refer to:

Vladimir Magomedovich Semyonov (born 1940), Russian colonel-general; first president of the Karachay-Cherkess Republic
Vladimir Semyonovich Semyonov (1911–1992), Soviet diplomat 
Vladimir Semyonov (footballer) (born 1972), Russian footballer
Vladimir Semyonov (water polo) (1938–2016), Russian Olympic water polo player